This is a list of airports in Peru, sorted by location.

Peru, officially the Republic of Peru, is a country located in western South America. It is bordered in the north by Ecuador and Colombia, in the east by Brazil, in the southeast by Bolivia, in the south by Chile, and in the west by the Pacific Ocean.

The country is divided into 25 regions, which are subdivided into provinces and districts. Peru's capital city is Lima, located in the Lima Province (which is not part of any region).



Airports 
Of a total of 234 airports, this list contains Peru's 5 international airports with scheduled services, 20 domestic airports with scheduled services, 63 domestic airports without scheduled services, and 5 military airports, making a total of 93 main airports, of which 25 have scheduled commercial airlines services.

See also
 Transport in Peru
 List of airports by ICAO code: S#SP - Peru
 Wikipedia: WikiProject Aviation/Airline destination lists: South America#Peru

References
 Peru Department of Transport and Communication
 
 
  – includes IATA codes
 
 
 

Peru
 
Airports
Airports
Peru